Uničov is a town in Olomouc District in the Olomouc Region of the Czech Republic. It has about 11,000 inhabitants. The historic town centre is well preserved and is protected by law as an urban monument zone.

Administrative parts
Villages of Benkov, Brníčko, Dětřichov, Dolní Sukolom, Horní Sukolom, Nová Dědina, Renoty and Střelice are administrative parts of Uničov.

Geography
It lies in the Upper Morava Valley lowland on the Oslava River.

History

Uničov is one of the seven royal Moravian towns. It was founded around 1213 by the Margrave Vladislaus III, the brother of King Ottokar I of Bohemia. It received Magdeburg rights in 1223 and was granted further privileges by Ottokar's successor King Wenceslaus I in 1234. The town was to become a centre of ore and precious metal mining, but the deposits were not so plentiful. The town therefore reoriented itself to trade and crafts, and in 1327 it was fortified.

Until the Hussite Wars, town administration of Uničov was controlled by German colonizers. In 1422, Hussite forces under the command of Sigismund Korybut occupied the town and got rid of the German administration. After the accession of the Hussite king George of Poděbrady in 1458, the town became a centre of the new confession until it fell to his rival Matthias Corvinus in 1479.

A part of the Habsburg monarchy from 1526, Uničov prospered until the Battle of White Mountain in 1620. For participating in the Bohemian rebellion, the town was divested of its privileges by Emperor Ferdinand II and made a subject of the Austrian House of Liechtenstein, a verdict that however was overruled a few years later.

The citizens nevertheless suffered severeley in the Thirty Years' War, when in 1642 the town was occupied by Swedish troops. In 1643, a large fire further damaged Uničov. The Swedes did not leave the town until 1650. The town recovered only slowly from the consequences of the war and had economic problems. Uničov became a small rural town.

After the Seven Years' War, Emperor Joseph II met here with the Prussian king Frederick the Great in 1770, a rapprochement of the former enemies that would lead to the First Partition of Poland two years later.

After World War II the remaining German population was expelled. In 1948, the construction of a large engineering plant began, which led to the migration of new residents to the town.

Demographics

Economy
The main commercial activity of Uničov nowadays takes place at the engineering-metallurgical complex UNEX. This heavy engineering company is worldwide known for its production of bucket-wheel excavators.

Sights

The town hall is landmark of the town square, located in the middle of the square. It was built in the late 14th or early 15th century and originally served as a market house. The town hall was rebuilt several times and lost its Gothic character. In the 19th century, it was rebuilt to its current pseudo-Renaissance form.

It was completed in 1743.

The Church of the Assumption of the Virgin Mary comes from the first half of the 14th century. It is a significant example of Gothic and late Renaissance architecture. The church burned down a total of eight times and was therefore repaired and modified many times. it has two towers, one of them being octagonal.

The Church of the Exaltation of the Holy Cross is a remnant of a Minorite monastery complex that was abolished in the 19th century. In addition to the baroque rebuilt part, the original gothic part is also visible. Today it serves as a concert hall.

Vodní branka ("water gate") is an architecturally valuable Renaissance building that was part of the town fortifications and served as armory. Today it is the town museum.

Notable people
Sigismund Albicus (c. 1360–1427), Archbishop of Prague
Petr Uličný (born 1950), football player and manager
Jan Březina (born 1954), politician; served as Uničov mayor in 1995–1997
Jan Hruška (born 1975), bicycle racer
Lukáš Plšek (born 1983), ice hockey player

Twin towns – sister cities

Uničov is twinned with:
 Bieruń-Lędziny County, Poland
 Dubno, Ukraine
 Jelšava, Slovakia
 Lędziny, Poland
 Roccagorga, Italy

References

External links

Cities and towns in the Czech Republic
Populated places in Olomouc District